This is a list of windmills in the English county of Shropshire.

Locations
Confirmed

Maps
1752 John Rocque
1808 Baugh
1827 C & G Greenwood
1832 Ordnance Survey
1833 Ordnance Survey

Notes

Mills in bold are still standing, known building dates are indicated in bold. Text in italics denotes indicates that the information is not confirmed, but is likely to be the case stated.

Sources
Unless otherwise indicated, the source for all entries is:- or the linked Windmill World page.

References

History of Shropshire
Windmills in Shropshire
Lists of windmills in England
Windmills